The Pittsburgh Light Rail (commonly known as The T) is a  light rail system in Pittsburgh, Pennsylvania, and surrounding suburbs. It operates as a deep-level subway in Downtown Pittsburgh, but runs mostly at-grade in the suburbs south of the city. The system is largely linear in a north-south direction, with one terminus near Pittsburgh's central business district and two termini in the South Hills. The system is owned and operated by Pittsburgh Regional Transit. The T is one of the surviving first-generation streetcar systems in North America, with the oldest portions of the network dating back to 1903 and the Pittsburgh Railways.

History

Overview 
In the early 1960s, Pittsburgh had the largest surviving streetcar system in the United States, with the privately owned Pittsburgh Railways Company operating more than 600 PCC cars on 41 routes. In 1964 the system was acquired by the Port Authority of Allegheny County, which rapidly converted most routes to buses. By the early 1970s, only a handful of streetcar routes remained, most of which used the Mt. Washington Transit Tunnel just south of the Monongahela River to reach the South Hills area.

At that time, Pittsburgh Regional Transit planners were determined to scrap the rail system entirely in favor of busways (now called "BRT" for "Bus Rapid Transit") and an automated guideway transit system developed by Westinghouse Electric called Skybus. Community opposition rallied against the plan and in favor of retaining the electric rail trolley system and upgrading it into modern LRT. In the end, the LRT option was adopted for the South Hills suburbs, along with development of a busway ("BRT") system for the eastern and western suburbs.

Subway tunnels 
The modern subway in downtown Pittsburgh between Steel Plaza and First Avenue stations uses the Pittsburgh & Steubenville Extension Railroad Tunnel, which began construction in 1863. Rail lines (trolleys) had been a staple of the city and region since the late 19th century, the idea of a downtown to Oakland or East Liberty subway had been considered since at least the 1910s. A public referendum was passed to fund such a subway with an initial investment of $6 million on July 8, 1919, another $5.5 million subway plan was finalized at City Hall in meetings on March 28, 1932, and the public/private Allegheny Conference presented detailed plans and funding for a subway system on June 4, 1947.

Pittsburgh Railways 

Pittsburgh Railways was one of the predecessors to Pittsburgh Regional Transit. It had 666 PCC cars, the third largest fleet in North America. It had 68 street car routes, of which only three (until April 5, 2010 the 42 series, the 47 series, and 52) are used by Pittsburgh Regional Transit as light rail routes. The oldest portions of these old Pittsburgh Railways routes now served by the Pittsburgh Light Rail system date to 1903–1909. With the PRT's Transit Development Plan, many route names will be changed to its original, such as the 41D Brookline becoming the 39 Brookline. Many of the streetcar routes have been remembered in the route names of many Pittsburgh Regional Transit buses (e.g. 71 series).

1895 to 1905 was a time of consolidation for the numerous street railways serving Pittsburgh. On July 24, 1895 the Consolidated Traction Company was chartered and the following year acquired the Central Traction Company, Citizens Traction Company, Duquesne Traction Company and Pittsburgh Traction Company and converted them to electric operation. On July 27, 1896 the United Traction Company was chartered and absorbed the Second Avenue Traction Company, which had been running electric cars since 1890.

The Southern Traction Company acquired the lease of the West End Traction Company on October 1, 1900. Pittsburgh Railways was formed on January 1, 1902, when the Southern Traction Company acquired operating rights over the Consolidated Traction Company and United Traction Company.

Unfortunately the lease and operate business model proved hard to support and the company declared bankruptcy twice, first in 1918 lasting for 6 years and then again in 1938, this time lasting until January 1, 1951.

On July 26, 1936 Pittsburgh Railways took delivery of PCC streetcar No. 100 from the St. Louis Car Company. It was placed in revenue service in August 1936, the first revenue earning PCC in the world.

Large scale abandonments of lines began in the late 1950s, usually associated with highway or bridge work.

1960s and Skybus '70s 

In the 1960s a  automated guideway transit system was planned fanning out to the north, south, east, southeast and west including connections to both the Pittsburgh International Airport the Allegheny County Airport, Monroeville Mall and adjacent to Kennywood Amusement Park. The modern subway/light rail system can be traced to the abandonment of the proposed "Skybus" system in the mid-1970s, and the subsequent $265 million federal grant on May 7, 1979, for construction of a downtown subway and modernization of suburban light rail.

Modern system

Downtown subway and Beechview Line (Stage I) 
PRT, working with community representatives and government officials, undertook a detailed study on the future of the South Hills trolley lines, resolving to transform these valuable, high-density transit corridors into a modern LRT system. The resulting Stage I LRT plan achieved a comprehensive reconstruction and upgrading of the  "main line" between downtown and the suburbs of Bethel Park and Upper St. Clair via Mount Lebanon and Beechview—basically following the Skybus alignment. The crowning achievement was to be a   downtown subway, eliminating the trolleys' slow, street-running loop through Pittsburgh's Golden Triangle.

On December 10, 1980, after receiving federal funding, Pittsburgh Regional Transit began construction on Stage One of its first "modern" light rail/subway service, the "T", which used a former Pittsburgh Railways trolley route to connect Downtown Pittsburgh to the South Hills. Stage One began with two construction projects – the downtown subway, and the former trolley route from the newly constructed South Hills Village Station and Light Rail Maintenance Center to Castle Shannon – both ends working toward the middle section of the route.

The first modern light rail cars began operation from South Hills Village to Castle Shannon on April 15, 1984. The downtown subway opened on July 3, 1985, initially with fare-free "demonstration" service running only as far as the then-new Station Square station for the first few days. The last day of streetcar service running on streets in downtown – and across the historic Smithfield Street Bridge – was July 6, 1985, with the subway opening for full service on July 7.

The last leg of the modern suburban "Beechview" line (from Castle Shannon to South Hills Junction via Mt. Lebanon and Beechview) was approved for funding May 8, 1985, with $20 million in federal grants, and PRT completed the modern system on May 22, 1987, at a total cost of $522 million. The suburban line in the south hills were former streetcar lines that had been rehabilitated to accommodate light rail vehicles. The Beechview line was reconstructed (being completely double-tracked) and routed from the South Hills Junction through the Mount Washington Transit Tunnel, emerging at a newly constructed station at Station Square before crossing the Monongahela river on the Panhandle Bridge (a former railway bridge), which then led into a newly built downtown (cut and cover tunnel) subway with four stations, which incorporated the nineteenth century Pittsburgh & Steubenville Extension Railroad Tunnel. The downtown subway had four stations, Steel Plaza, Wood Street, Gateway Center, and Penn Station. The original subway branched north of Steel Plaza, with one branch heading west to Wood Street and one branch heading east to Penn Station.

A suburban trolley line with conventional jointed rail, aging electrical overhead and single track segments was reborn as a wholly double track light rail line with continuous welded rail and modern catenary.  Upon completion of the subway, all former streetcar lines were removed from the surface streets of Downtown Pittsburgh.

Overbrook Line reconstruction (Stage II) 
The line from South Hills Junction to Castle Shannon via Overbrook (now called the Overbrook Line) was first constructed by the Pittsburgh and Castle Shannon Railroad (P&CSRR) between 1872 and 1874. In 1905, Pittsburgh Railways leased the route, and between 1909 and 1910, converted it to dual gauge, retaining the existing narrow gauge for the coal hauling trains and adding the broad  for passenger service using streetcars. While the line was electrified with overhead power, the coal trains continued to use existing steam locomotives.

While the Beechview line was rebuilt during the 1980s, the Overbrook line remained largely unchanged and continued to be operated using PCC cars. The reconstruction of this line would be part of the Stage II project, to be performed at a future date pending additional funding. However, the condition of the track and infrastructure of the Overbrook line continued to deteriorate and in 1993, Pittsburgh Regional Transit determined the line to be unsuitable for safe operation in its current state and suspended service on the line. The line remained dormant until 1999, when the PRT broke ground on the Overbrook Line reconstruction project.

The rebuilt Overbrook line was essentially an entirely new line built along the original line's right of way. As had been done with the Beechview line prior, the rebuilt line was completely double-tracked with continuously welded rail, pandrol clip fixation, upgraded catenary and signaling, and other improvements. The line as rebuilt featured eight high-level platform ADA accessible stations and, unlike the Beechview line, did not retain any street-level stops. The Overbrook line reopened in June 2004. Coinciding with the opening, Pittsburgh Regional Transit purchased 28 additional light rail cars to support the line and increase overall system capacity. At this time, the 55 existing cars were completely rehabilitated as well. Ironically there is no station in the Overbrook neighborhood since the rail line is built into a hillside where construction of an ADA accessible station would involve considerable complexity.

In addition, as part of the Stage II project, upgrades to the traction power network, Operations Control Center, and signals and communications had been implemented.

North Shore Connector 

In January 1999, Pittsburgh Regional Transit began undertaking environmental analysis, planning, and began construction of a light rail line to connect Pittsburgh's Downtown and North Shore. Federal funding was approved for the extension on February 6, 2004.

The main project involved twin-bore tunnels below the Allegheny River to connect a refurbished Gateway Station, which was the former Downtown terminus, to North Side station, located just west of PNC Park, and Allegheny station, located just north of Heinz Field. The completed project opened to the public on March 25, 2012. The North Side station serves PNC Park, the Andy Warhol Museum, Allegheny Center and numerous office buildings in the vicinity. The Allegheny station serves Heinz Field, the Carnegie Science Center, the National Aviary, the Community College of Allegheny County, the Rivers Casino, and other nearby businesses.

Unexpectedly high bids from construction companies had stalled construction, originally scheduled to begin in Fall 2005. The entire project was budgeted at $435 million, with approximately 80% ($348 million) coming from the Federal Transit Administration. Pittsburgh Regional Transit began construction in October 2006, with the first bore completed on July 10, 2008, and the second bore under the Allegheny river completed in early 2009. Service began on March 25, 2012, with a final cost of $523.4 million.

Fleet and depot

Current fleet 

Pittsburgh Regional Transit operates a fleet of 83 LRVs as of 2006:

Trains are generally run in a two-car configuration. The routes have sections that have a dedicated right of way as well as mixed sections that run along roadways with automobile traffic. Generally, stations along roadways have low level platforms while stops along the dedicated rights of way have high level platforms. To allow easy boarding in both situations, the trains have two sets of doors at the front, with a low set and a staircase as well as a high set with level access from the platform to the train.

Retired PCC fleet 

The four remaining PCC cars were retired in 1999. These PCCs were from an original fleet of 12 "homebuilt" cars constructed in the 1980s in the PRT shops using a combination of new underframes, lower body panels, front and rear ends, interiors, wiring and controls, together with reconditioned components such as trucks, motors, and upper body parts and windows reused from original Pittsburgh PCCs numbered in the 1700 series. They avoided the breakers yard, along with some other trolleys from the later years of PRT ownership.

Depot 

The South Hills Village Rail Center (SHVRC) is located at the end of South Hills Village station, adjacent to the shopping mall of the same name. All of the revenue light rail vehicles (LRVs) and some Maintenance of Way vehicles are stored there. All the old PCC cars were stored there as well prior to their retirement in 1999.

Lines 

The "T" has three active lines along with several discontinued lines.

Red Line 

Formerly 42S. The Red Line runs between South Hills Village and Downtown Pittsburgh via the Beechview neighborhood. Six stops serve Upper St. Clair and Bethel Park before merging with the Blue Line at Washington Junction. The Red Line splits again before Overbrook Junction and the Red Line heads toward the suburbs of Castle Shannon, Mt. Lebanon, and Dormont. After entering Pittsburgh city limits, the route features a variety of closely spaced stops through Beechview, where bus service is limited due to the hilly terrain, despite a dense population. Fifteen stops occur between the split in the lines and their re-juncture at South Hills Junction. The route then enters the Mt. Washington Transit Tunnel. The remaining stations in Downtown are at Station Square, First Avenue, Steel Plaza, and Wood Street. In March 2007, the closure of the Palm Garden Bridge for refurbishment suspended the 42S for five months; it reopened in September 2007.

Silver Line 

Formerly 44L, 47L, and Blue Line – Library. The Silver Line begins near the Washington County–Allegheny County line in the Library neighborhood of South Park. Fifteen stops serve Library, Bethel Park, and South Park before merging with the Blue Line at Washington Junction. Some weekday and all weekend trips end at Washington Junction, where a timed transfer to the Blue Line allows continuing a trip to Overbrook and Downtown. For the trips that serve Downtown, the line splits again before Overbrook Junction station on the Red Line, as the Blue Line instead follows the Overbrook route. The line then makes eight well-spaced stops on its arc through the Overbrook, Brookline, Carrick, Beltzhoover, and Bon Air neighborhoods of southern Pittsburgh. The line merges with the Red Line at South Hills Junction before entering the Mt. Washington Transit Tunnel. The remaining stations are at Station Square, First Avenue, Steel Plaza, Wood Street, Gateway, North Side, and Allegheny. To avoid confusion with "Blue Line – South Hills Village", the line was renamed to "Silver Line – Library" on March 15, 2020.

Blue Line 

Formerly 47S. In 2005, Pittsburgh Regional Transit opened a new parking garage at the South Hills Village station. The 47S line was established in an effort to relieve congestion on the Red Line for the additional traffic that the parking garage created. The Blue Line – South Hills Village route follows the South Hills Village leg of the Red Line and the common leg from Washington Junction to Willow Station, which is adjacent to Overbrook Junction, where it switches to the Silver Line mainline. It follows the Silver Line to South Hills Junction where it reunites with the Red Line before entering downtown.

Discontinued lines

47D Drake 

When light rail service began, PCC trolley service continued from Drake north through Castle Shannon along the Overbrook line to downtown. All downtown platforms incorporated both low- and high-level platforms enabling them to handle both types of vehicles. When safety concerns prompted the closure of the Overbrook line in 1993 the Drake line was cut back to Castle Shannon; service would later terminate at Washington Junction. In September 1999, PRT withdrew the four remaining active-service PCCs from service and closed the Drake line altogether.

47 Shannon 
This was a PCC trolley line that led commuters either northbound (via Overbrook line) or southbound (via South Hills Junction, Drake or Library lines) to Castle Shannon station. The line's turnaround point, the Shannon Loop, was located just past the station at Mt. Lebanon Blvd. This loop no longer exists. Also removed from the Shannon route were the tracks surrounding the old Castle Shannon Municipal Building (which is also gone) at the intersection of Castle Shannon Blvd. and Willow Ave. At this Overbrook line connector, incoming trolleys ran in front of the building and outgoing trolleys ran behind the building and through the narrow passage between the building and Castle Shannon Blvd.

Brown Line 

Formerly 52. The Brown Line ran from South Hills Junction over Mount Washington and across the Monongahela River to downtown Pittsburgh, terminating at Wood Street. It was the only downtown route that did not stop at Station Square nor use the Mount Washington tunnel. The line supplemented the 46K bus, running 4 times each during the morning rush and 3 times during the evening rush. A throwback to the days of the streetcars, the Brown Line did not feature stations or street-level boarding stops but instead allowed for boarding and unloading at designated 46K bus stops. The steepest grade on the entire light rail system is on this line, about 10 percent.

This service was discontinued in the March 27, 2011 system-wide cuts. The line is still in existence, and is used as a bypass to the Mount Washington Tunnel during maintenance. The tunnel is closed to all vehicular (bus) and light rail traffic during maintenance.

As of February 2021, Pittsburgh Regional Transit's newly released 25-year plan includes the possibility of reviving service on the Allentown line due to continuing growth of the neighborhood.

44L and 44S 
The 44 Castle Shannon-Library (44L) and the 44 Castle Shannon-Beechview (44S) were truncated versions of the Blue Line – Library and Red Line, respectively. The 44L ran from Library to Washington Junction. The 44S ran between Overbrook Junction and Traymore. It was introduced when the closure of the Palm Garden Bridge cut off the Beechview line from the Downtown. The 44S was discontinued when the Palm Garden Bridge re-opened, in favor of the 42C.

Future

Extensions and additions 
Since November 1993 the Authority has studied the so-called "Spine Line"  to the Oakland neighborhood which is the third largest center for commuters in the commonwealth and the home to Carlow University, the University of Pittsburgh, Carnegie Mellon University, the Pittsburgh Technology Center, the University of Pittsburgh Medical Center and Phipps Conservatory. Thus far the extension to Oakland has not gone beyond the design phase. The First Avenue station was added in 2001; service to Penn Station was suspended on September 2, 2007.  The "T" is most heavily used in four stations downtown (three of which are underground), where service is free of charge.

Proposed extensions 
Former Chief Executive of Allegheny County, Dan Onorato, hoped to eventually extend the light-rail system east to Oakland and west to Pittsburgh International Airport. In 2009, Onorato along with Congressman Mike Doyle requested approximately $7 million in funding from the federal government for preliminary planning of the extension.

The Pittsburgh Post-Gazette has taken a strong editorial stance in late 2012 for a workable extension to the Northern suburbs all the way to Cranberry.

See also 

 List of Pittsburgh Light Rail stations

References

External links 

 
 Jon Bell's photos of Pittsburgh Light Rail vehicles and stations
 Photos of heritage and modern Pittsburgh Light Rail vehicles and stations at nycsubway.org
 Map
 Shawn Bennear's Photo History of Transit In Pittsburgh

Light rail in Pennsylvania
Electric railways in Pennsylvania
Port Authority of Allegheny County
Underground rapid transit in the United States
5 ft 2½ in gauge railways in the United States
Streetcars in Pennsylvania
Passenger rail transportation in Pennsylvania
Transportation in Pittsburgh
650 V DC railway electrification